Kanichukulangarayil CBI is a 2008 Malayalam film by Suresh-Vinu having Manoj K. Jayan in the lead role. This movie is based on the real life incident Kanichukulangara murder case.

Plot 
Ajith (Sai Kumar) and Suresh (Meghanathan) are the proprietors of Anamala Chit Funds. The success of Anamala Chit Funds is due to the hard work of its  managing director, Ratheesh. But due to some differences between his bosses, Ratheesh resigns and sets up another firm and started competing with Anamala.

Ratheesh becomes successful soon and this makes Ajith and Suresh jealous. Soon, Ratheesh and his sister are killed by an oncoming truck while travelling by car at Kanichukulangara. First the police starts investigation, but due to corrupt officials the investigation goes wrong. Then CBI intervenes. CBI officer Arjun (Manoj K.Jayan) with the help of his friend James George (Suresh Krishna) who investigated the case before CBI probe, arrest all the culprits. Meanwhile, Ratheesh's widow commits suicide as she is in heavy debt. At the end, the Judiciary frees all the culprits due to lack of evidence. However while coming out, Anamala Suresh and Ajith are gunned by the brother of Ratheesh, who confesses to the police he did because the culprits should not destroy anymore families like they did to him.

Cast 
 Manoj K. Jayan as Arjun
 Suresh Krishna as James George 
 Lakshmi Sharma as Susan Thomas
 Sai Kumar as Ajith
 Meghanathan as Suresh
 Sadiq as Ratheesh
 Rajan P. Dev as Krishnagopal
 Kollam Thulasi as Adv.Rahim
 Chali Pala as Somasekharan
 Sudheer Sukumaran as Police Officer
 Reshmi Boban as Thanky Ratheesh

References

External links 
 http://www.nowrunning.com/movie/5459/malayalam/kanichu-kulangarayil-cbi/index.htm
 
 https://web.archive.org/web/20090531131833/http://popcorn.oneindia.in/title/1385/kanichu-kulangarayil-c-b-i.html

2000s Malayalam-language films
2008 films